Adolphe Charlet (22 June 1908 - 20 March 2009) was a French sculptor. He won the Prix de Rome in Sculpture in 1938.

Early life
Adolphe Charlet was born on 22 June 1908 in Verdun. He graduated from the École des Beaux-Arts.

Career 
Charlet won the Prix de Rome in Sculpture in for Je m'appelle Légion 1938.

Death
Charlet died on 20 March 2009.

References

1908 births
People from Verdun
École des Beaux-Arts alumni
French male sculptors
French centenarians
Men centenarians
20th-century French sculptors
20th-century French male artists
Prix de Rome winners
2009 deaths